Società Azionaria Gestione Aeroporto Torino S.p.A. (SAGAT) is the operator of Turin Airport. The controlling interests of the company was purchased by Italian Infrastructures Investment Fund I in January 2013.

History
In December 2012 Italian Infrastructures Investment Fund I (F2i First Fund) acquired 28% stake of SAGAT from FCT Holding, a subsidiary of the Comune of Turin, for €35 million. The fund acquired a further 22.786% from Sintonia, a holding company for Benetton family in the same month. Sintonia sold their 24.385% stake to F2i and Tecnoinvestimenti (1.599%, a subsidiary of Tecno Holding, owned by several chambers of commerce), for €30.5 million, after failing to bid the stake held by the Comune of Turin. The shares held by Aeroporto Guglielmo Marconi di Bologna (4.13%) was purchased by 2i Aeroporti and Tecnoinvestimenti for €5.166 million on 27 January 2014. F2i First Fund sold 49% shares of 2i Aeroporti to Ardian and Crédit Agricole Assurances in February 2015.

Shareholders

 2i Aeroporti, a joint venture of Primo Fondo Italiano per le Infrastrutture, Ardian and Crédit Agricole Assurances (54.46%)
 Equiter, a subsidiary of Intesa Sanpaolo (12.40%)
 FCT Holding, a subsidiary of the Comune of Turin (10%)
 Finpiemonte Partecipazioni, a subsidiary of Piedmont Region (8%)
 Tecnoinfrastrutture, a subsidiary of Tecno Holding (6.76%)
 Metropolitan City of Turin (5.00%)
 Aviapartner (0.42%)
 treasury stock (2.96%)

Subsidiaries
Aeroporti Holding S.r.l., a joint venture of SAGAT (55.45%), Equiter (35.31% stake) and Tecnoinfrastrutture (9.24%), was a minority owner of Aeroporto Guglielmo Marconi di Bologna (5.913%) and Aeroporto di Firenze (AdF; 33.402% stake), the operator of Bologna and Florence Airport, respectively. The minority interests in AdF was sold to Corporación América in February 2014.

References

External links
 

Airport operators of Italy
Transport in Turin
Transport in Piedmont
Metropolitan City of Turin
Companies based in Piedmont
Region-owned companies of Italy